This is a list of sister cities in the United States state of Michigan. Sister cities, known in Europe as twin towns, are cities which partner with each other to promote human contact and cultural links, although this partnering is not limited to cities and often includes counties, regions, states and other sub-national entities.

Many Michigan jurisdictions work with foreign cities through Sister Cities International, an organization whose goal is to "promote peace through mutual respect, understanding, and cooperation."

A
Adrian
 Moriyama, Japan

Albion
 Noisy-le-Roi, France

Ann Arbor

 Belize City, Belize
 Dakar, Senegal
 Hikone, Japan
 Juigalpa, Nicaragua
 Peterborough, Canada
 Remedios, Cuba
 Tübingen, Germany

Auburn Hills
 Saltillo, Mexico

B
Battle Creek
 Takasaki, Japan

Bay City

 Ansbach, Germany
 Goderich, Canada

Belleville
 Machynlleth, Wales, United Kingdom

Birmingham
 Rittō, Japan

C
Cadillac
 Rovaniemi, Finland

Chelsea
 Shimizu, Japan

Clinton Township
 Yasu, Japan

Coldwater
 Soltau, Germany

D
Dearborn
 Qana, Lebanon

Detroit

 Chongqing, China
 Dubai, United Arab Emirates
 Kitwe, Zambia
 Minsk, Belarus
 Nassau, Bahamas
 Toyota, Japan
 Turin, Italy

DeWitt
 Kōka, Japan

Dundee
 Tsubame, Japan

E
East Lansing
 Cluj-Napoca, Romania

F
Flint

 Hamilton, Canada
 Poltava, Ukraine
 Tolyatti, Russia

Frankenmuth
 Gunzenhausen, Germany

Fremont
 Yahaba, Japan

G
Gaylord
 Pontresina, Switzerland

Grand Rapids

 Bielsko-Biała, Poland
 Ga East District, Ghana
 Ga West District, Ghana
 Gangnam (Seoul), South Korea
 Ōmihachiman, Japan
 Perugia, Italy
 Zapopan, Mexico

H
Hancock
 Porvoo, Finland

Holland
 Querétaro, Mexico

J
Jackson
 Carrickfergus, Northern Ireland, United Kingdom

K
Kalamazoo

 Kingston, Jamaica
 Numazu, Japan
 Pushkin, Russia

L
Lansing

 Akuapim South District, Ghana
 Asan, South Korea
 Guadalajara, Mexico
 Ōtsu, Japan
 Pianezza, Italy
 Saltillo, Mexico
 Sanming, China

M
Mackinac Island
 Lybster, Scotland, United Kingdom

Marquette

 Higashiōmi, Japan
 Kajaani, Finland

Marshall
 Kōka, Japan

Mason
 Vitina, Kosovo

Midland
 Handa, Japan

Monroe
 Hōfu, Japan

Mount Pleasant
 Okaya, Japan

Muskegon

 Hartlepool, England, United Kingdom
 Ōmuta, Japan

P
Petoskey
 Takashima, Japan

Pontiac
 Kusatsu, Japan

Port Huron
 Chiquimula, Guatemala

R
Redford

 Gau-Algesheim, Germany
 Sankt Johann in Tirol, Austria

Rochester Hills
 Tuzi, Montenegro

S
Saginaw

 Amanokrom, Ghana
 Tokushima, Japan
 Zapopan, Mexico

Saline

 Brecon, Wales, United Kingdom
 Lindenberg im Allgäu, Germany

Sault Ste. Marie
 Sault Ste. Marie, Canada

South Haven
 Quilalí, Nicaragua

Southfield
 Dongducheon, South Korea

Sterling Heights

 Cassino, Italy
 Jaffna, Sri Lanka
 Legazpi, Philippines
 Sant'Elia Fiumerapido, Italy
 Shëngjin (Lezhë), Albania
 Sorsogon City, Philippines
 Tetovo, North Macedonia

Sturgis
 Wiesloch, Germany

T
Tecumseh

 Tecumseh, Canada
 La Verpillière, France

Traverse City
 Kōka, Japan

Troy
 Aley, Lebanon

W
Walker
 Colac Otway, Australia

Wyandotte
 Komaki, Japan

References

Michigan
Populated places in Michigan
Michigan geography-related lists
Cities in Michigan